Dupracetam is a nootropic drug from the racetam family.

One of its metabolites, 1-Methylhydantoin, displays renal toxicity in high doses.

See also
 Piracetam

References 

Racetams
Acetamides
Hydrazides